Mining in Australia has long been a significant primary sector industry and contributor to the Australian economy by providing export income, royalty payments and employment. Historically, mining booms have also encouraged population growth via  immigration to Australia, particularly the gold rushes of the 1850s. Many different ores, gems and minerals have been mined in the past and a wide variety are still mined throughout the country.

Production overview 
In 2019, Australia was the world's largest producer of iron ore and bauxite; the second largest of gold, manganese, and lead; the third largest of zinc, cobalt, and uranium; the fifth largest of salt; the sixth largest of copper and nickel; the eighth largest producer of silver and tin; the fourteenth largest of phosphate; and the fifteenth largest of sulfur. The country is also a major producer of precious stones. Australia is the world's largest producer of opal and is one of the largest producers of diamond, ruby, sapphire and jade. In non-renewable energies, in 2020, the country was the 30th largest producer of oil in the world, extracting 351.1 thousand barrels / day.  In 2019, the country consumed 1 million barrels / day (20th largest consumer in the world). The country was the 20th largest oil importer in the world in 2018 (461.9 thousand barrels / day).  In 2015, Australia was the 12th largest world producer of natural gas, 67.2 billion m3 per year. In 2019, the country was the 22nd largest gas consumer (41.9 billion m3 per year) and was the 10th largest gas exporter in the world in 2015: 34.0 billion m3 per year.  In the production of coal, the country was the 4th largest in the world in 2018: 481.3 million tons. Australia is the 2nd largest coal exporter in the world (387 million tons in 2018)

History
Mining was an important early source of export income in Australian colonies and helped to pay for the imports needed for the growing colonial economies. Silver and later copper were discovered in South Australia in the 1840s, leading to the export of ore and the immigration of skilled miners and smelters. The first economic minerals in Australia were silver and lead in February 1841 at Glen Osmond, now a suburb of Adelaide in South Australia. Mines including Wheal Gawler and Wheal Watkins opened soon after. The value of these mines was soon overshadowed by the discovery of copper at Kapunda (1842), Burra (1845) and in the Copper Triangle (Moonta, Kadina and Wallaroo) area at the top of Yorke Peninsula (1861).

Gold rushes

In 1851, gold was found near Ophir, New South Wales. Weeks later, gold was found in the newly established colony of Victoria. Australian gold rushes, in particular the Victorian gold rush, had a major lasting impact on Victoria, and on Australia as a whole. The influx of wealth that gold brought soon made Victoria Australia's richest colony by far, and Melbourne the continent's largest city. By the middle of the 1850s, 40% of the world's gold was produced in Australia.

Australia's population changed dramatically as a result of the gold rushes: in 1851 the population was 437,655 and a decade later it was 1,151,957; the rapid growth was predominantly a result of the "new chums" (recent immigrants from the United Kingdom and other colonies of the Empire) who contributed the 'rush'. Although most Victorian goldfields were exhausted by the end of the 19th century, and although much of the profit was sent back to the UK, sufficient wealth remained to fund substantial development of industry and infrastructure.

Location

Australia has mining activity in all of its states and territories.  The Minerals Council of Australia estimates that 0.02% of Australia's land surface is directly impacted by mining.

Particularly significant areas today include the Goldfields, Peel and Pilbara regions of Western Australia, the Hunter Region in New South Wales, the Bowen Basin in Queensland and Latrobe Valley in Victoria and various parts of the outback. Places such as Kalgoorlie, Mount Isa, Mount Morgan, Broken Hill and Coober Pedy are known as mining towns.

Major active mines in Australia include:
Olympic Dam in South Australia, a copper, silver and uranium mine believed to have the world's largest uranium resource, and in 2018 producing 6% of world production
Super Pit gold mine, which has replaced a number of underground mines at Boulder, Western Australia

Minerals and resources

Large quantities of minerals and resources :
 Iron ore – Australia was the world's largest producer in 2019, supplying 580 million tonnes, 37% of the world's output (39% of the world's contained metal production).
 Nickel – Australia was the world's fifth largest producer in 2019, producing 6.7% of world output.
 Aluminium – Australia was the world's largest producer of bauxite in 2019 (27% of world production), and the second largest producer of alumina (15%), after China.
 Copper – Australia was the world's 6th largest producer in 2019 (5% of world's production).
 Gold – Australia was the second largest producer after China in 2019, producing , 10% of the world's output.
 Silver –  In 2019 Australia was the sixth largest producer, producing , 5% of the world's output.
 Uranium – Australia is responsible for 12% of the world's production and was the world's third largest producer in 2018, after Kazakhstan and Canada.
 Diamond – Australia has the third largest commercially viable deposits after Russia and Botswana. Australia also boasts the richest diamantiferous pipe with production reaching peak levels of 42 metric tons (41 LT/46 ST) per year in the 1990s.
 Opal – Australia is the world's largest producer of opal, being responsible for 95% of production.
 Zinc – Australia was third to China and Peru in zinc production in 2019, producing 1.3 million tonnes, 10% of world production.
 Coal – Australia is the world's largest exporter of coal and fourth largest producer of coal behind China, USA and India.
 Oil shale – Australia has the sixth largest defined oil shale resources.
 Petroleum – In 2019 Australia was the thirty-third largest producer of petroleum.
 Natural gas – Australia is world's largest exporter of LNG with 77.5 million tonnes in 2019.
 Rare earth elements – In 2019 Australia was the third largest producer after China and USA, with 10% of the world's output.

Much of the raw material mined in Australia is exported overseas to countries such as China for processing into refined product. Energy and minerals constitute two-thirds of Australia's total exports to China, and more than half of Australia's iron ore exports are to China.

Statistical chart of Australia's major mineral resources
Australia ranks among the top 4 in economic resources for 21 primary industrial minerals, more than any other nation. Statistics are for December 2016.

Units of measurement:  t = tonne; kt = kilotonne (1,000 t); Mt = million tonne (1,000,000 t); Mc = million carat (1,000,000 c)

Coal mining

Coal is mined in every state of Australia except South Australia. It is used to generate electricity and is exported. 54% of the coal mined in Australia is exported, mostly to eastern Asia. In 2000/01, 258.5 million tonnes of coal was mined, and 193.6 million tonnes exported, rising to 261 million tonnes of exports in 2008–09. Coal also provides about 85% of Australia's electricity production. Australia is the world's leading coal exporter.

Uranium mining

Uranium mining in Australia began in the early 20th century in South Australia. At 2016 Australia contained 29% of the world's defined uranium resources. The three largest uranium mines in the country are Olympic Dam, Ranger Uranium Mine and Beverley Uranium Mine. Future production is expected from Honeymoon Uranium Mine and the planned Four Mile Uranium Mine.

Natural gas
Based on 2008 CSIRO report, Australia estimated to have stranded gas reserves with about 140 trillion cubic feet or enough to fulfil the needs of a city with one million people for 2,800 years.

Entrepreneurs and magnates

At various stages in the history of the mining industry in Australia, individual mining managers, directors and investors have gained significant wealth and the subsequent publicity. In most cases the individuals are designated Mining Magnates or Australian mining entrepreneurs.

Economics

A number of large multinational mining companies including BHP, Newcrest, Rio Tinto, Alcoa, Chalco, Shenhua, Alcan and Xstrata operate in Australia. There are also many small mining and mineral exploration companies listed on the Australian Securities Exchange (ASX). Overall, the resources sector represents almost 20% of the ASX market by capitalisation, and almost one third of the companies listed.

Mining is Australia’s largest sector by share of national Gross Domestic Product, 10.4% in 2020. This is up from only 2.6% in 1950, and from 10% at the time of federation in 1901. In 2020 mineral exports contributed 62% of Australia's total export revenue, valued at $270 billion. Australia is the world's largest exporter of coal (35% of international trade), iron ore, lead, diamonds, rutile, zinc and zirconium, second largest of gold and uranium, and third largest of aluminium. Japan was the major purchaser of Australian mineral exports in the mid-1990s.

Of the developed countries, perhaps only Canada and Norway have mining as such a significant part of the economy; for comparison, in Canada mining represents about 3.6% of the Canadian economy and 32% of exports, and in Norway mining, dominated by petroleum, represents about 19% of GDP and 46% of exports. By comparison, in the United States mining represents only about 1.6% of GDP.

The mining sector employed in 2021 about 270,000 people, about 2.0% of the total labour force. 

Australia’s mining industry is 86% foreign owned, Although many people think BHP and Rio Tinto as Australian companies, BHP is 76% foreign owned, and Rio Tinto is 83%. Between them they constitute 70% of listed mining company resources.

Technology and services
Australia's mining services, equipment, and technology exports are over $2 billion annually.

Environment and politics

Australia is the world’s third largest exporter of fossil fuel carbon dioxide-emissions potential. “Australia mines about 57 tonnes of CO2 potential per person each year, about 10 times the global average”.

Mining has had a substantial environmental impact in some areas of Australia. Historically, the Victorian gold rush was the start of the economic growth of the country, leading to major increases in population. However, it also resulted in deforestation, consequent erosion, and pollution in the areas that were mined. The effects on the landscape near Bendigo and Ballarat can still be seen today.  Queenstown, Tasmania's mountains were also completely denuded through a combination of logging and pollution from a mine smelter, and remain bare today. It is estimated that 10 million hectares of land have been affected throughout the history of mining in Australia. Because Australia's mines are distributed across varying climates the knowledge gained from one mine's restoration does not easily extrapolate to other sites.

Uranium mining has been controversial, partly for its alleged environmental impact but more so because of its end uses in nuclear power and nuclear weapons. The Australian Labor Party, one of Australia's two major parties, maintains a policy of "no new uranium mines". As of 2006, the increased world demand for uranium has seen some pressure, both internally and externally on the ALP, for a policy change. Australia is a participant in international anti-proliferation efforts designed to ensure that no exported uranium is used in nuclear weapons.

During the period of 2010 and 2013, Australia saw a debate about the Minerals Resource Rent Tax (MRRT). The tax, levied on 30% of the "super profits" from the mining of iron ore and coal in Australia. A company was to pay the tax when its annual profits reach $75 million. The controversy regarding the MRRT was such that an "ad war" between the government and mining interests began in May 2010 and continued until the downfall of Prime Minister Kevin Rudd in June 2010. The Australian Electoral Commission released figures indicating mining interests had spent $22 m in campaigning and advertisements in the six weeks prior to the end of the Rudd prime ministership. Mining interests re-introduced the advertisements arguing against the proposed revised changes during the 2010 federal election campaign.

The Coalition, led by Tony Abbott, went to the 2010 and 2013 elections promising to repeal the tax. The Coalition won the 2013 election, and after one failed attempt to pass the bill, the Mining Tax Repeal Bill finally passed both houses of Parliament on 2 September 2014 and the tax was subsequently repealed. 

A January 2014 poll conducted by UMR Research, however, found that a majority of Australians still think that multinational mining companies do not pay enough tax.

Mining disasters

New Australasian Gold Mine
Creswick in the Victorian goldfields is the site of the New Australasian No.2 Gold Mine. On 12 December 1882, 29 miners became trapped underground by water that broke through from the adjacent flooded No.1 Gold Mine workings. Only five survived. Despite two days of frantic pumping, water filled the mine workings. The trapped men scrawled last notes to their loved ones on billy cans before they drowned. Some of these have been kept and still bear the messages. The men that perished left 17 widows and 75 dependent children.

Mount Kembla Colliery
In 1902 a gas explosion in the Mount Kembla Colliery in the Illawarra region of New South Wales resulted in the deaths of 96 men and boys, either while at work or in the course of trying to rescue others. Every family in the village lost a relative. A service of commemoration is held annually on 31 July at the Mount Kembla Soldiers' and Miners' Memorial Church. This was Australia's worst mining disaster.

North Mount Lyell
On 12 October 1912 at Queenstown, Tasmania the North Mount Lyell Fire caused the death of 42 miners, and required breathing apparatus to be transported from Victoria to rescue trapped miners. The subsequent royal commission was inconclusive as to the cause.

Mount Mulligan
The 1921 Mount Mulligan mine disaster occurred in Far North Queensland. A coal dust explosion killed 75 men.

Moura
Four serious accidents have occurred at mines in the Central Queensland town of Moura. The first accident took the lives of 13 men in September 1975. In July 1986 there was an explosion at Moura Number 4 Mine. 12 coal miners lost their lives in this disaster that sparked controversy after experts claimed the accident was avoidable. Another explosion killed two men in January 1994 and just eight months later another explosion deep underground took the lives of 11 men.

Bulli Colliery
On 23 March 1887 an explosion at the mine in Bulli in New South Wales killed 81 people. A royal commission was set up to investigate the explosion and concluded:
 The gas explosion propagated a coal dust explosion and travelled towards the fresh air at the surface. 

The commission was of the opinion that carelessness, want of skill, and the loose and perfunctory manner in which the principal operations in the mine were performed by the majority of the men, and countenanced by at least the overman and deputies, were immediately connected with, and led up to, the occurrence of the final catastrophe, when, by the direct negligence of probably one man, eighty other men lost their lives, and   that the mine deputy, the mine overman (foreman) and the mine manager were guilty of contributory negligence.

Box Flat Mine
At the Box Flat Mine in Swanbank, South East Queensland, 17 miners were lost after an underground gas explosion occurred on 31 July 1972. Another man died later from injuries sustained in the explosion. The mine tunnel mouths were sealed and the mine closed shortly after.

Australian mining in literature, art and film
 Henry Lawson, His Father's Mate from While The Billy Boils, 1896 (short story)
 Nickel Queen, based on the Western Australian nickel boom of the late 1960s
 Colin Thiele, The Fire in the Stone (book which became a film)
 Wendy Richardson, Windy Gully 1989 Currency Press (play)
 Conal Fitzpatrick, Kembla- The Book of Voices 2002 Kemblawarra Press (poetry) 
 Henry Handel Richardson, The Fortunes of Richard Mahony: Australia Felix Takes place in the chaos of the early Ballarat goldrush.
 Richard Lowenstein, Strikebound (1984 film).
 Tim Burstall, The Last of the Knucklemen (1979 film, based on the play by John Power, who also wrote a novelisation of the film).
 Kriv Stenders, Red Dog (2011 film, based on the true story)
 Franklin White. Miner with a Heart of Gold: biography of a mineral science and engineering educator. 2020. Friesen Press. ISBN 978-1-5255-7765-9 (Hardcover) 978-1-5255-7766-6 (Paperback) 978-1-5255-7767-3 (eBook)

See also

 Economy of Australia
 Mining in the Northern Territory
 Mining in Western Australia
 NSW Minerals Council
 Uranium mining controversy in Kakadu National Park

References

External links

Minerals Council of Australia
WA’s mining boom: Where does it leave the environment?
Australian Mining